The North Side Fargo High Style Residential Historic District in Fargo, North Dakota has significance dating back to 1894.  It is a  historic district with 33 contributing buildings.  It includes Colonial Revival, American Foursquare, and other architecture.  It was listed on the National Register of Historic Places in 1987.

Gallery

See also
North Side Fargo Builder's Residential Historic District

References

Houses on the National Register of Historic Places in North Dakota
Colonial Revival architecture in North Dakota
Houses in Fargo, North Dakota
Historic districts on the National Register of Historic Places in North Dakota
National Register of Historic Places in Cass County, North Dakota
Neighborhoods in North Dakota
American Foursquare architecture
1894 establishments in North Dakota